Bhataura is a village in West Champaran district in the Indian state of Bihar.Narkatiaganj is the nearest city and police station of Bhataura

Demographics
 India census, Bhataura had a population of 2059 in 403 households. Males constitute 51.62% of the population and females 48.37%. Bhataura has an average literacy rate of 42.44%, lower than the national average of 74%: male literacy is 62%, and female literacy is 37%. In Bhataura, 22% of the population is under 6 years of age.

References

Villages in West Champaran district